The 2011 Texas State Bobcats football team represented Texas State University–San Marcos in the 2011 NCAA Division I FCS football season. The Bobcats were led by first year head coach Dennis Franchione and played their home games at Bobcat Stadium. Despite playing seven games against teams from their former conference, the Southland Conference, they were technically an FCS independent as they transitioned to the Football Bowl Subdivision. They will become a member of the Western Athletic Conference in 2012 and become a full FBS member in 2013. They finished the season 6–6.

Schedule

References

Texas State
Texas State Bobcats football seasons
Texas State Bobcats football